Foreign affiliate trade statistics (FATS), also known as transnational corporation (TNC) data details the economic operations of foreign direct investment-based enterprises.  

Collection of such information, and aggregation at the national level, can provide economists and policymakers with insight as to the relationship that transnational corporations, being FDI-related enterprises, have on economies.

FATS indicators - including:

 employment information,
 expenditures,
 exports and imports (specific to FDI-owned firms)
 inter- and intra-firm trade,
 profits,
 sales,
 value-added (product).

Inward FATS - Data which represent the operations of foreign-owned (in the FDI sense, i.e. at a minimum of 10% of book value) firms in the local economy, or country.

Outward FATS - Data which represent the operations firms abroad, which are owned by a firm in our home-country ("owned" in the FDI sense, i.e. at a minimum of 10% of book value).

FATS are an economic indicator which has a direct linkage to WTO-GATS Mode 3 Legal Commitments; GATS Mode 3 is one of the Four Modes of Supply enshrined as the framework of the General Agreement on  Trade in Services GATS of the World Trade Organization WTO.  

FATS describe economic activities which take place as a result of WTO-GATS Mode 3 enterprise trade, or trade which takes place under Commercial Presence circumstances.

The standard for definition for Commercial Presence in the WTO-GATS differs from the generally accepted definition of FDI, which under IMF Balance of Payments Volume 5 standards is 10%; WTO-GATS Commercial Presence defines ownership level benchmarks at 10% of enterprise book value.

See also
 Foreign direct investment
 General Agreement on Trade in Services

Statistical databases on Services Trade Statistics, FDI and FATS
 OECD statistics on trade in services database
 OECD statistics on value added and employment
OECD Statistics for Trade in Services from Publication
 Eurostat - Statistics Explained: Foreign affiliates statistics - FATS
 Eurostat database: Industry, Trade and Services
 US BEA page on international economic accounts
 JETRO database for FDI and trade in goods and services
 UNCTAD FDI/FATS database
 UNCTAD World Investment Directory online
 ITC/UNCTAD Investment Map: Foreign direct investment together with foreign affiliates, international trade and market access

See also

.

fr:Investissement direct à l'étranger